The Men's marathon at the 2011 World Championships in Athletics was held starting and finishing at Gukchae-bosang Memorial Park  on September 4. Abel Kirui was the defending champion.

The story was all Kirui.  Running a casual pace to 15 km, first the Moroccan contingent tried to test the field.  The pace picked up and the field strung out.  After 25 km, it was down to Kirui, Vincent Kipruto, Eliud Kiptanui, Feyisa Lilesa and Abderrahime Bouramdane.  Then Kirui put the hammer down, running 14:18 between 25 and 30 km.  Nobody could go with him and he ran all alone, extending his lead for the remainder of the race to finish in 2:07:38.  The 2:28 gap was the largest winning margin in World Championship history.  After dropping  Bouramdane and Kiptanui. Kipruto and Lilesa ran tactically for the remainder of the race, with Kipruto getting silver.

The race was also the World Cup team competition.  In that competition, the scoring is based on the cumulative time of the top three finishers for each team.  Each country participating in the World Cup was allowed 5 entries into the marathon.  The event was clearly won by Kenya, with 1st, 2nd and 5th-place finishers (Kenya also had the 6th-place finisher).  Perennial champion Japan finished second, a cumulative minute ahead of Morocco.

Medalists

World Marathon Cup

Note: Marathon Cup medals are not listed in the championships medal table

Records
Prior to the competition, the records were as follows:

Qualification standards

Schedule

Results

Final

World Cup scoring

See also
2011 World Marathon Cup

References

External links
Marathon results at IAAF website

Marathon
Marathons at the World Athletics Championships
World Championships
Men's marathons
Marathons in South Korea